Olamilekan Massoud Al-Khalifah Agbeleshebioba (born 8 November 1993), known professionally as Laycon, is a Nigerian rapper, singer, songwriter and media personality. He is the winner of Big Brother Naija season 5 and currently the youth ambassador of Ogun State, Nigeria since 6 October 2020, He also won the Artist Of The Year at the 2020 Naijatraffic Awards.

Early life and education
Olamilekan Massoud Al-Khalifah Agbeleshebioba was born and raised in Lagos, Nigeria. He is a native of Baluwen, Odeda, Ogun State.

He attended lagos state model college merian, lagos Nigeria from 2003-2009

In 2012, he got admitted to study philosophy in University of Lagos and graduated in 2016 with a second class upper degree.

Career
Laycon started his career interning as the personal assistant to the MD and CEO of Latjum Global Nigeria Limited when he was still an undergraduate in University of Lagos. He moved to Bestman Games, Ikoyi, Lagos where he worked as a sales and business development personnel after graduating from the university. Two months later, he became the personal assistant to the assistant director of welfare in administration and human resources at Lagos State Ministry of Information and Strategy. During the course of his career, he worked as a freelance writer for different companies and establishments.

On 6 October 2020, Laycon was appointed the youth ambassador by the governor of Ogun State, Dapo Abiodun.

On 3 January 2021, Laycon received a chieftaincy title from the Onipokia of Ipokia, Ogun State, Yisa Adesola Olaniyan as the Akeweje of Ipokia Kingdom, Ogun State at the 2021 Opo Day celebration.

Music career
At a tender age, Laycon began rapping and writing songs. In 2014, he was among the ten artistes that performed at the 2014 Coke Studio University of Lagos event. He was also a top ten finalists of the 2017 MTV Base LSB challenge. Laycon signed into Olugbenga Jackson's founded record label Fierce Nation in 2019. On 21 February 2019, he released a track, "Fierce" with Chinko Ekun and Reminisce  from his second EP Who Is Laycon?. He released another single "Senseless" on 28 August 2020.

October 2020, the remix of Nobody by DJ Neptune was released. His verse in the remix of the song titled "Nobody iCONs Remix" was recorded two days after he left the Big Brother Naija Reality TV Show.
Mr. Real featured him in the remix of his song Baba Fela. The remix was released on 30 January 2021.

On 10 March 2021, Laycon released two singles - Wagwan and Fall For Me (ft YKB). Wagwan debuted at number five on billboard's top ten global triller chart. On 1 April 2021, Laycon announced that he will be dropping his first album on 30 April 2021. On 30 April 2021, Laycon's Album Shall We Begin was released and the album peaked at number two in Nigeria top album chart, and number one on the Nigeria iTunes album chart. The album went on to chart in over 30 countries and counting. In September 2021, Laycon release the original soundtrack album to his reality show I Am Laycon which was also titled I Am Laycon. This was his second project of the year 2021 and it peaked at number nine on Nigeria album chart. This made it Laycon's third project to hit the top 10 charts in two years. Also, he was featured on "Enter My Head" by fellow former BBNaija housemate Veeiye, on her debut EP Young & Reckless.
On the 28th of December 2021, Laycon headlined and sold out his first-ever concert tagged iCONs FEST at the 6000 capacity Eko Convention Center, Eko Hotels Lagos.

Big Brother Naija season 5
Laycon entered the show as the number nineteenth contestant on 19 July 2020 and soon established himself as a fan favorite. He became the first housemate of the season to be verified on Instagram on 22 July 2020. He broke a record, becoming the first housemate in the show's history to reach 1 million followers on Instagram while still in the house on 19 September 2020.

During the finale of the show on 27 September 2020, he was declared the winner scoring a record 60% of the total votes cast and went home with the ₦85 million grand prize.

Discography

Mixtapes
Any Given Monday (The Playlist) (2019)
Any Given Monday II (2019)

EPs
Young Black and Gifted (2016)
Who is Laycon? (2020)

Albums
Shall We Begin (2021)
I am Laycon (The Original Soundtrack) (2021)

Singles
Fierce (2019)
Senseless (2020)
HipHop (2020)
Fall for me (2021)
Wagwan (2021)
New Dimension (2022)
2000 (2022)

Filmography

Television

Accolades

References

1993 births
21st-century Nigerian male singers
Big Brother (franchise) winners
Living people
Nigerian rappers
People from Ogun State
Yoruba-language singers
English-language singers from Nigeria
University of Lagos alumni
Participants in Nigerian reality television series